Pavel Stolbov (30 August 1929 – 16 June 2011) was a gymnast and Olympic champion who competed for the Soviet Union.

Olympics
Stolbov competed at the 1956 Summer Olympics in Melbourne where he received a gold medal in team combined exercises with the Soviet team (Viktor Chukarin, Valentin Muratov, Boris Shakhlin, Albert Azaryan and Yuri Titov).

World championships
Stolbov received an individual silver medal in pommel horse and bronze medal in parallel bars at the 1958 World Artistic Gymnastics Championships in Moscow, and a silver medal in horizontal bar at the 1962 World Artistic Gymnastics Championships in Prague.

References

1929 births
2011 deaths
Russian male artistic gymnasts
Soviet male artistic gymnasts
Olympic gymnasts of the Soviet Union
Gymnasts at the 1956 Summer Olympics
Olympic gold medalists for the Soviet Union
Olympic medalists in gymnastics
Medalists at the 1956 Summer Olympics
Medalists at the World Artistic Gymnastics Championships